Cotinguiba Esporte Clube, commonly known as Cotinguiba, is a Brazilian football club based in Aracaju, Sergipe state. They won the Campeonato Sergipano six times.

History
The club was founded on October 10, 1909. They won the Campeonato Sergipano in 1918, 1920, 1923, 1936, 1942, and in 1952, and the Campeonato Sergipano Série A2 in 1993.

Achievements

 Campeonato Sergipano:
 Winners (6): 1918, 1920, 1923, 1936, 1942, 1952
 Campeonato Sergipano Série A2:
 Winners (1): 1993

Stadium

Cotinguiba Esporte Clube play their home games at Estádio Lourival Baptista, nicknamed Batistão. The stadium has a maximum capacity of 14,000 people.

References

Association football clubs established in 1909
Football clubs in Sergipe
1909 establishments in Brazil